Anndrew Blythe Daguio Gorostiza (born March 12, 2003), known professionally as Andrea Brillantes, is a Filipino actress. She is best known for her roles as the titular character in Annaliza (2013) and as Marga Bartolome in Kadenang Ginto (2018). She also appeared in the television series E-Boy (2012) and Alyna (2010), and has played various other roles.

Career
Brillantes' first television appearance was in the children's comedy show Goin' Bulilit. She later appeared in the 2010 ABS-CBN drama series Alyna, where she played Sofia Alvaro, a young girl who is the lost daughter of Alyna (Shaina Magdayao). In 2012, she appeared on E-Boy as Princess, a boyish girl who believed in fairy tales. She made guest appearances in Wansapanataym and other shows from TV5.

In 2013, she made her first big break by playing the main role in the family drama series Annaliza. She portrayed Annaliza (originally portrayed by award-winning late actress Julie Vega), a girl who faced numerous trials under her foster parents. The show debuted on May 27, 2013, and ended on March 21, 2014. In 2014, she starred in Hawak Kamay as Lorry Magpantay-Agustin. In 2015, Brillantes starred in the remake version of Pangako Sa 'Yo as Lia Buenavista.

In 2018, Brillantes played her first role as an antagonist in hit afternoon series, Kadenang Ginto, in which she played as Marga. Marga would soon be a household name and a subject of memes. Due to the series' phenomenon success, Brillantes and her loveteam Seth Fedelin, alongside co-lead stars Francine Diaz and Kyle Echarri were formed into the Gold Squad, a teenage quartet. The four of them would later topbill several projects. As of now, more members were added to the squad. It is currently called, the Squad Plus.

Discography

Filmography

Film

Television/Digital

Awards and nominations

Personal life
Brillantes had a previous relationship with Seth Fedelin before she entered in a relationship with actor and athlete Ricci Rivero.

References

External links

2003 births
Living people
Actresses from Rizal
ABS-CBN personalities
Filipino child actresses
21st-century Filipino women singers
Star Magic
Star Music artists
People from Rizal
Tagalog people
21st-century Filipino actresses